The 1987 FIBA European Championship, commonly called FIBA EuroBasket 1987, was the 25th FIBA EuroBasket regional basketball championship, held by FIBA Europe. It was held in Greece between 3 and 14 June 1987. Twelve national teams entered the event under the auspices of FIBA Europe, the sport's regional governing body. The Peace and Friendship Stadium, located in the Neo Faliron in Piraeus, Attica, was the hosting venue of the tournament. The host, Greece, won its first FIBA European title by defeating the defending champions and heavily favored Soviet Union, with a 103–101 score in a gripping final decided in overtime. Greece's Nikos Galis was voted the tournament's MVP.

Venues
All games were played at the Peace and Friendship Stadium in Piraeus, Attica.

Qualification
A total of twelve teams qualified for the tournament. To the top seven teams from the previous tournament, four more teams were granted berths via a qualifying tournament. Greece qualified as hosts of the tournament.

Hosts:

Top seven teams from Eurobasket 1985:

Top four teams from the qualifying stage:

Squads

Format
The teams were split in two groups of six teams each. The top four teams from each group advance to the quarterfinals. The winners in the knockout semifinals advance to the Final, and the losers figure in a third-place playoff.
The losers from the quarterfinals stage compete in a separate bracket to define places 5th through 8th in the final standings.
The fifth and sixth teams from each group competed in another bracket to define places 9th through 12th in the final standings.

Preliminary round

Group A
Times given below are in Eastern European Summer Time (UTC+3).

|}

Group B

|}

Knockout stage

Championship bracket

Quarterfinals

Semifinals

Third place

Final

5th to 8th place

9th to 12th place

Awards

Final standings

References

External links
1987 European Championship for Men archive.FIBA.com

1987
1986–87 in European basketball
1986–87 in Greek basketball
1987
Sports competitions in Athens
June 1987 sports events in Europe